Devin Haney vs. Jorge Linares was a professional boxing match contested between WBC lightweight champion Devin Haney, and former three-division world champion Jorge Linares. The bout took place at the Michelob Ultra Arena in Las Vegas, Nevada, on May 29, 2021, with Haney's WBC title on the line. Haney won by unanimous decision with the judges scoring the bout 116-112, 116-112, 115-113 in his favor.

Background 
After Haney's unanimous decision win over Cuban veteran Yuriorkis Gamboa, Haney called out fellow American lightweight and newly crowned unified lightweight world champion, Teófimo López, who had recently defeated pound-for-pound star Vasyl Lomachenko three weeks prior, saying it was 'the main fight' he wanted to make happen.  However, the IBF mandated López to fight Australian George Kambosos Jr., with López deciding to go in that direction to minimize the risk of being stripped of his title.

In January 2021, after Ryan García captured the WBC interim lightweight title after his seventh-round stoppage over Luke Campbell, the WBC were set to order Haney to defend his title against García. However, García seemed to show little interest in a potential fight with Haney, and voiced his desire to face Gervonta Davis or Manny Pacquiao instead, ultimately fighting neither in the end.

After weeks of negotiations, it was announced that Haney was set to defend his WBC title against former three-division world champion Jorge Linares on May 29, 2021 in Las Vegas.

Fight card 

<small>

References 

2021 in boxing
Boxing in Las Vegas
2021 in sports in Nevada
May 2021 sports events in the United States
Boxing matches